The Borough Theatre, Abergavenny is the principal theatre in the Monmouthshire town of Abergavenny in south east Wales.

Location, History & Amenities 

The theatre is part of the Victorian era town hall building dating from 1870 and is situated on Cross Street in the town centre. The theatre was extensively renovated in the early 1990s, and its intimate auditorium affords excellent sightlines and acoustics, which succeeds in blending historic and traditional features with a modern ambience.

The Beatles played at the Borough Theatre in Abergavenny on Saturday June 22, 1963.

The Borough Theatre is a performance base for the Abergavenny Amateur Operatic & Dramatic Society (AAODS). It hosts an active programme of drama, music and other arts, attracting a wide variety of touring artistes.

External links
Borough Theater website homepage

Theatres in Wales
Buildings and structures in Monmouthshire
Tourist attractions in Monmouthshire